The 1999 Nokia Cup, southern Ontario men's provincial curling championship was held February 8–14 at the Brantford & District Civic Centre in Brantford, Ontario. The winning rink of Rich Moffatt, Howard Rajala, Chris Fulton and Paul Madden from Ottawa would go on to represent Ontario at the 1999 Labatt Brier in Edmonton, Alberta.

Teams
The teams included eight regional winners, two challenge round winners, the defending Brier champion and World champion Wayne Middaugh rink and the 1998 Olympic silver medallist Mike Harris rink.

Standings

Tie Breaker
February 13, 2:00pm

Playoffs

Semifinal
February 13, 7:00pm

Final
February 14, 2:30pm

External links
1999 Nokia Cup of CurlingZone
1998-99 Ontario Curling Association Annual Report

Ontario
Ontario Tankard
Sport in Brantford
1999 in Ontario
February 1999 sports events in Canada